"All Things Are Possible" is the debut solo single by former America member Dan Peek, from the album of the same name, All Things Are Possible. Released in 1979, it was a No. 1 hit on contemporary Christian music stations (staying at the top of the charts for 13 weeks), as well as reaching the mainstream Pop and Adult Contemporary charts, making it one of the first, if not the first CCM crossover hit.
The song was written by Peek and Chris Christian, who also produced the single. Since its release, it has been included on several various artists, CCM compilations.

Chart performance

References

1979 songs
1979 debut singles
Songs written by Dan Peek